Aleksandr Aksyonov, or variants, may refer to:

Oleksandr Aksyonov (born 1994), Ukrainian footballer
Aleksandr Aksyonov (politician) (1924–2009), Soviet politician from Belarus
Aleksandr Aksyonov (tennis), Ukrainian tennis player who was a runner-up at the 2006 Alexander Kolyaskin Memorial
Alexandr Axenov (fencer), Kazakhstani fencer, in the 2006 Asian Games and other tournaments
Alexandr Axenov (water polo), Kazakhstani water polo player, in the 2010 Asian Games and other tournaments

See also
Aksyonov (surname)